Pseudoalteromonas distincta is a marine bacterium.

History
Pseudoalteromonas distincta was isolated from a marine sponge near the Komandorski Islands in 1995. In 2000, Alteromonas distincta was reclassified and added to Pseudoalteromonas distincta.

References

External links

Type strain of Pseudoalteromonas distincta at BacDive -  the Bacterial Diversity Metadatabase

Alteromonadales